Arlettys Acosta (born 25 October 1999) is a Cuban taekwondo practitioner. She won the gold medal in the women's 67kg event at the 2018 Central American and Caribbean Games held in Barranquilla, Colombia.

In 2019, she won one of the bronze medals in the women's 67kg event at the Pan American Games held in Lima, Peru. In 2020, she competed at the Pan American Olympic Qualification Tournament where she finished in 3rd place and she did not qualify to compete at the 2020 Summer Olympics in Tokyo, Japan.

In 2022, she competed in the women's lightweight event at the World Taekwondo Championships held in Guadalajara, Mexico.

References

External links 
 

Living people
1999 births
Place of birth missing (living people)
Cuban female taekwondo practitioners
Pan American Games medalists in taekwondo
Pan American Games bronze medalists for Cuba
Medalists at the 2019 Pan American Games
Taekwondo practitioners at the 2019 Pan American Games
Competitors at the 2018 Central American and Caribbean Games
Central American and Caribbean Games gold medalists for Cuba
Central American and Caribbean Games medalists in taekwondo
21st-century Cuban women